The Dows Street Historic District is located in Ely, Iowa, United States.  The area exemplifies the importance the railroad and transportation in general played in the development of the town's central business district.  Community members revitalized a plat of land the railroad had abandoned into a commercial and residential corridor.  The historic district is made up of several frame buildings typical of the Late Victorian style.  It has been listed on the National Register of Historic Places since 2003.

Contributing properties
The Historic Ely Elevator is the only light-industrial property in the district which includes mostly small commercial buildings and residences.

References

Victorian architecture in Iowa
Commercial buildings on the National Register of Historic Places in Iowa
National Register of Historic Places in Linn County, Iowa
Historic districts in Linn County, Iowa
Historic districts on the National Register of Historic Places in Iowa